2019 HKFC International Soccer Sevens, officially known as The HKFC Citi Soccer Sevens due to sponsorship reasons, is the 20th staging of the HKFC International Soccer Sevens tournament. It was held on 17–19 May 2019. In this edition, there were a number of celebrations to commemorate 20 years of the tournament.

Competing Teams

Masters Tournament
Group A
 TDW Discovery Bay: Ho Kwok Chuen, Vlamir Soartes, Matija Maretic, Martin Rigby, Kieran McKnight, Bruno Cortes, Pascal Laroumanie, Paul Crompton, Bruno Oliveiro, Gabriel Biscaia, Daniel Cortes
 Citi All Stars: Alan Fettis, Pascal Chimbonda, Alan Dunne, Sean Davis, Marvin Andrews, Carl Heggs, Matt Piper, Jamie Cureton, Darren Currie, Gary Alexander, Ben Chorley
 Nottingham Forest Mobsters: Kevin Pilkington, Jamal Campbell-Ryce, Paul McKenna, John Thompson, Grant Holt, Brett Ormerod, Hayden Mullins, Sam Clingan, Tem Hansen, Martin Tierney
Singapore Cricket Club Masters: Adam Bowden, Andrew Hutcheon, Owen Monaghan, Amos Boon, Matt Hulen, John Norfolk, Martin Goerojo, Tan Chun Hao, Michael Hemmingway, PJ Roberts, Michael Drake
 HKFC Chairman's Select: Murphy Mok, Jamie Milne, Philip Dowding, Simon Galvin, Stu McInnes, Colin Spanos, Stephen Tew, Rahul Dansanghani, Graeme Lane, Darren McEntee, Danny Beattie

Group B
 Wallsend Boys Club: Steve Harper, John Watson, Dean Beckwith, Luis Corrales, John Gbenda Charles, Matt West, Keith Gillespie, Paul Ifill, Fabio Alcantara, Craig Dundas, Glen Southam
 playonpro: David James, Don Hutchison, Frank Sinclair, Darren Bent, Emile Heskey, Peter Beardsley, Michael Brown, John Arne Riise, Jari Litmanen, George Boateng, Michael Gray
 Eleven FC: Tam Siu Wai, Chan Ka Ki, Lai Kai Cheuk, Poon Yiu Cheuk, Lee Chi Ho, Li Chun Yip, Yoon Dong-hun, Angelo Marcio da Silva Cascao, Aender Naves Mesquita, Chiu Chung Man
 KCC Veterans
 HKFC Masters: Jan Souleyman, Tom McGillycuddy, Anthony Sassi, Adrian Worth, Blake Harding, Paul Fitzgerald, Donny Tse, Fouad Ben Allal, Tom Pugh, Mark Grainger, Rich Le Gallez

Main Tournament

Group A
 West Ham United: Joseph Anang, Ben Johnson, Jeremy Ngakia, Harrison Ashby, Conor Coventry, Louie Watson, Dan Kemp, Nathan Holland, Sean Adarkwa, Joe Powell
Fulham: Taye Ashby-Hammond, Cody Drameh, Moritz Jenz, Jerome Opoku, Connor McAvoy, Timmy Abraham, Jayden Harris, Nicolas Santos-Clase, Sonny Hilton, Tyrese Francois
Portimonense: Nedja, Jamerson, Fali, Koday Nagagima, Ryonsuke Ohori, Sérgio Santos, Sérgio Neto, Iago Oliviera, Gustavo Hebling, Francisco Cardoso
 HKFC Captain's Select: Issey Maholo, Max Poon, Jorge Ruiz, Sebastian Beer, Shane Jeffery, Andrew Wylde, Calum Eskrine, Calvin Harris, Raphael Merkies, Michael Hampshire

Group B
 Aston Villa: Ákos Onódi, Isaiah Bazley-Graham, Bradley Burton, Dominic Revan, Lewis Brunt, Jaden Philogene-Bidace, Aaron Pressley, Jack Clarke, Cameron Archer, Indiana Vassilev
 Leicester City: Viktor Johansson, Luke Thomas, Dennis Gyamfi, Justen Kranthove, Kiernan Dewsbury-Hall, Layton Ndukwu, Sidnei Tavares, Conor Tee, Dempsey Arlott-John, Ryan Loft 
Kitchee
Singapore Cricket Club: Ronnie Smollett, Khairul Anwar, Jonathan Huang, Tim Walter, Jahan Rezai, Jack Cullinane, Ivor Teagle, Ben King, Chang Guo Guang, Sam Balls

Group C
Brighton & Hove Albion: Tom McGill, Archie Davies, Alex Cochrane, George Cox, Warren O'Hora, Max Sanders, Jordan Davies, Ryan Longman, Steven Alzate, Ben Wilson
Newcastle United: Nathan Harker, Owen Bailey, Kelland Watts, Lewis Cass, Matthew Longstaff, Rosaire Longelo, Elias Sørensen, Thomas Allan, Oliver Walters, Luke Charman
Kashima Antlers: 
Kerry Yau Yee League Select: Aron Ruszel, Daniel Martyn, Dylan McWilliams, Edwin Tizard, Gurung Saraj, Kieran Robinson, Martin Fray, Mathieu Boyer, Peter Smith, Silvio Ruprah

Group D
Rangers: Nicky Hogarth, Cameron Palmer, Stephen Kelly, Nathan Patterson, Josh McPake, Andrew Dallas, Daniel Finlayson, Kai Kennedy, Jordan Houston, Matthew Shiels
Wolverhampton Wanderers: Carlos Heredia, Niall Ennis, Ryan Giles, Pedro Gonçalves, Elliot Watt, Ed Francis, Oskar Buur, Cameron John, Dion Sanderson
Hong Kong Football Club: Freddy Toomer, Callum Beattie, Michael Thurbon, Freek Schipper, Robert Bacon, Robert Scott, Marcus McMillan, Albin Brion, Jordon Brown, Shunsuke Nakamura
HKFA Red Dragons

Guest Referees
Jon Moss
Mike Riley

Main Tournament - Group Stage

Group A

Group B

Group C

 3rd and 4th place decided by 4-a-side Golden Goal game. Kerry Yau Yee League Select's goalkeeper, Pete Smith, scored the deciding goal.

Group D

 1st and 2nd place decided by 4-a-side Golden Goal game which Wolverhampton Wanderers won.

Main Tournament - Knockout Stage
Matches in the knockout stage were now 14 minutes each half, with golden goal extra time and a sudden death penalty shootout in the event of a draw.

Plate
 Bottom two teams of each group entered the quarter-finals of Plate.

Shield
 Losing teams of Cup quarter-finals entered the semi-finals of Shield.

Cup
 Top two teams of each group entered the quarter-finals of Cup.

References

Hong
Hon